Chib may refer to:

Persons with the name 
 Chibuzor Chilaka (born 1986), nickname "Chib", Nigerian footballer
 Malini Chib (born 1966), Indian social activist
 Prakash Singh Chib (1913–1945), British Indian Army officer
 Siddhartha Chib, Professor of Econometrics and Statistics at Washington University in St. Louis, Missouri, United States
 Baba Shadi Shaheed (formerly Maharaja Dharam Chand Chib), a Sufi saint

Other uses 
 Chib, a social subgroup associated with the Chibhal princely state of India
 CHIB, a defunct radio station of Chibougamau, Quebec, Canada
 Čib, today Čelarevo, a village in the Bačka Palanka Municipality, South Bačka District, Serbia

See also 
 Cib (disambiguation)